Robert Davies Defries,  (July 23, 1889 – October 25, 1975) was a Canadian physician and Director of Connaught Medical Research Laboratories.

Born in Toronto, Ontario, he received his M.D. from the University of Toronto in 1913.

Honours
 In 1946 he was made a Commander of the Order of the British Empire.
 In 1955 he was awarded an honorary Doctor of Laws from the University of Saskatchewan.
 In 1955 he received the Albert Lasker Public Service Award.
 In 1970 he was made a Companion of the Order of Canada.

References

External links
Robert Davies Defries archival papers held at the University of Toronto Archives and Records Management Services

1889 births
1975 deaths
Canadian public health doctors
Companions of the Order of Canada
Canadian Commanders of the Order of the British Empire
University of Toronto alumni